Leo Williams may refer to:
Leo Williams (musician) (born 1959), British-Jamaican bass guitarist
Leo Williams (athlete) (born 1960), American high jumper
Leo Williams (rugby union) (1941–2009), Australian rugby union official
Leo Williams (cricketer) (1900–1984), English cricketer

See also
Leonard Williams (disambiguation)